Svein Gjelseth (born 2 February 1950) is a Norwegian politician for the Labour Party.

He served in the position of deputy representative to the Norwegian Parliament from Møre og Romsdal in the term 2005–2009, meeting as a regular representative for two years meanwhile Karita Bekkemellem was appointed to the Cabinet. Gjelseth was a member of the Standing Committee on Transport and Communications.

Gjelseth held various positions in Herøy municipality council from 1979 to 2003, serving as mayor from 1989 to 1991.

References

1950 births
Living people
Labour Party (Norway) politicians
Members of the Storting
21st-century Norwegian politicians